Selsey is a seaside town and civil parish, about eight miles (12 km) south of Chichester in West Sussex, England. Selsey lies at the southernmost point of the Manhood Peninsula, almost cut off from mainland Sussex by the sea. It is bounded to the west by Bracklesham Bay, to the north by Broad Rife (rife being the local word for stream or creek), to the east by Pagham Harbour and terminates in the south at Selsey Bill. There are significant rock formations beneath the sea off both of its coasts, named the Owers rocks and Mixon rocks. Coastal erosion has been an ever-present problem for Selsey.

The B2145 is the only road in and out of the town crossing a bridge over the water inlet at Pagham Harbour at a point known as "the ferry". At one time Selsey was inaccessible at flood tide, and a boat was stationed at the ferry to take horses and passengers to and from Sidlesham.

Place name
According to Bede the name  Selsey is derived from the Saxon Seals-ey and can be interpreted as the Isle of Sea Calves (sea calves are better known as seals).

Edward Heron-Allen identified at least twenty different spellings of the place that we now know today as Selsey.

A selection of versions as identified by Heron-Allen are:

Seoles – Old English
Seleisi – Domesday Book 1086
Celesye – Assize Roll 1279

History

The earliest evidence of human habitation in the Selsey area goes back to the Stone Age. Various stone implements have been found which date to the Palaeolithic period. People have been living in the area ever since.

It is believed that, in the Late Iron Age, the Atrebates (one of the Belgae tribes) built a city at Selsey, similar in status to the pre-Roman urban centre (oppidum) at Hengistbury Head near Christchurch. So far there is no archaeological evidence to confirm this, although some have speculated that the old city that Camden refers to is indeed the old Belgae settlement and was located at the Mixon rocks, now south of Selsey Bill. Although the oppidum was thought to have been  centred on Selsey Bill, it is currently argued that Iron Age occupation was distributed across the region.

There have been various finds of silver and gold coins in the Selsey area. Gold coins from the Atrebates rulers named Commius, Tincommius, Verica, Eppillus, and Cunobelin were found on the beach in 1877, it is thought that these coins would have been minted locally. The ancient British coins would have been superseded by Roman coins and there have been finds of them too. In addition, some Anglo-Saxon gold fragments were found on the beach between Selsey and Bognor, these were dated as late 6th/ 8th century and what made them particularly interesting is that they had a runic inscription on them, the fragments were handed over to the British Museum.

Selsey was the capital of the Kingdom of Sussex, possibly founded by Ælle. Wilfrid arrived circa 680 and converted the kingdom to Christianity, as recorded by the Venerable Bede. Selsey Abbey stood at Selsey (probably where Church Norton is today), and was the cathedra for the Sussex Diocese until the Council of London ordered the removal of the See to Chichester in 1075, during the reign of William the Conqueror.

In the Domesday Book Selesie is mentioned under the hundred of Somerley:

"The Bishop(of Chichester) holds Selesie in domain. In the time of King Edward it was rated at ten hides, and so it continues. The arable is seven plough lands. There are two ploughs in the demesne, and fourteen villains with eleven bondsmen have five ploughs.".

The manor of Selsey remained in the Bishop of Chichesters hands until 1561, when it was taken over by the crown.

In July 1588 the Spanish Armada arrived off the Isle of Wight with the intention of attacking Portsmouth. The wind changed direction to the south-west. Men from the Manhood Peninsula serving under Francis Drake conceived a plan to lure the Spanish fleet onto the Owers rocks (off Selsey). However the Spanish Admiral, recognising the danger, decided to head for Calais.

In 1647, a fatality was recorded following a cricket match at Selsey when a fielder called Henry Brand was hit on the head by the batsman Thomas Latter, who was trying to hit the ball a second time. The incident repeated one at Horsted Keynes in 1624.

Over the centuries that Selsey has derived an income from the sea, one of the enterprises was smuggling. In the eighteenth century Selsey Bill was very much more isolated than it is today, and the sand spit extended farther out to sea. There was only the causeway connected to the mainland and that was covered at high tide. The approach of the local riding officer would have been conspicuous in the extreme. The Rectors of Selsey reputedly claimed a tithe on all kegs landed there, and stories also tell of a passageway leading from the Old Rectory (at Church Norton) to the remains of a Mound, thought to have been built by the Normans. The course of the tunnel was marked by a depression on the surface of the ground as late as 1911.

In the 1720s one Selsey man ran a regular ferry service to France, traveling back and forth every five weeks, and other prominent Selsey figures made considerable fortunes just from part-time work in the free-trade.

Landings were not confined to Selsey itself: in a single run in 1743 2,000 lbs of tea were brought inland at West Wittering some six miles (10 km) away.

In 1749 fourteen smugglers, members of the notorious Hawkhurst Gang, were accused of the murder of William Galley, a custom-house officer, and Daniel Chater, a shoemaker. Seven were tried and condemned to death at Chichester assizes; one died in gaol before sentence could be carried out and the other six were hanged at the Broyle north of Chichester. Subsequently, the bodies of two of the smugglers, John Cobby and John Hammond, were hung in gibbets at Selsey Bill so that they could be seen at great distance from east and west.

At the beginning of the 19th century, Selsey opened its first school. In 1818 premises were granted to the Rector and churchwardens of Selsey which were "on trust to permit the premises to be used for a schoolhouse or free school, for the gratuitous education of such poor children belonging to the Parish of Selsey as the said trustees or successors may think proper." The school was eventually taken over by the local authority in 1937.

Selsey was connected to Chichester from 1897 to 1935 by a rail link initially called the Hundred of Manhood and Selsey Tramway and later the West Sussex Railway. The light railway rolling stock was all second hand and not very reliable and the journey times lengthy. Various nicknames such as the "Selsey Snail" were attributed to the tram and comic postcards were issued reflecting its poor service.

Landmarks

The parish has a couple of Sites of Special Scientific Interest. Bracklesham Bay runs along the coastline of the parish. Pagham Harbour falls partly within the parish. The harbour and surrounding land is of national importance for both flora and fauna. The shingle spit is also of geological interest.

Medmerry Mill is a grade II listed tower windmill restored in the 1960s and currently in use as a gift shop.

Sport and leisure

Selsey has a Non-League football club Selsey F.C. who play at the High Street Ground.

Selsey Cricket Club

Selsey Cricket Club was founded in 1834 and is one of England's oldest cricket clubs.

A former president was Hubert Doggart, OBE, MA. He was the son of the sportsman Graham Doggart who rose to chair the Football Association. Doggart represented England in two Test matches in 1950. He was President of the M.C.C. (1981–1982), the Cricket Council (1981–1982) and the Cricket Society (1983–1998), and he chaired the Friends of Arundel Castle Cricket Club (1993–2003). In the 1970s he played occasionally for Selsey C.C.

Sir Patrick Moore, CBE was a former club secretary, an active playing member, and an Honorary Life Vice President. Selsey Cricket Club in Paddock Lane, is the home to the Sir Patrick Moore 3D Exhibition which recreates Moore's study at his home "Farthings" with original items on show.

Selsey are a Clubmark Club running two men's League sides, one Ladies League side, several Junior sides and Sunday and Midweek Friendly sides.

Selsey Arts

The wide landscapes, exposed coastal location and diverse birdlife lure artists to Selsey, many of whom belong to Arts Dream Selsey Artists. The society holds regular exhibitions and events.
The list of artists, who have featured Selsey in their work, include Whistler and Turner.

Education

Selsey has a secondary school called the Selsey Academy (formerly known as Manhood Community College up till September 2011) and two primary schools, Seal Primary School (now known as Seal Academy) and Medmerry Primary School.
Before and after the Second World War there were several private preparatory schools in Selsey including Broombank School housed in the former residence of the music hall entertainer Bransby Williams next to the Selsey Hotel. The owner/headmaster from the early 1950s until the school's closure in 1969 was William Percy Higgs (died Bristol 1986), a former Cambridge University organ scholar and music master at Eton. Higgs made Broombank a music and arts school attracting the children of well known actors, artists and musicians as well as temporary pupils from France, whose numbers occasionally matched those of the British children.

RNLI Selsey Lifeboat

Selsey had an RNLI lifeboat station and shop on Kingsway, east of Selsey Bill. The station was established in 1861. In 2014 Selsey had a Tyne-class lifeboat and a D Class Inshore Lifeboat which had its own boat house just off the beach. In 2011 Selsey Lifeboat Station celebrated 150 years during which period lifeboat crew have received 10 awards for gallantry.

A new boathouse, to replace the old off shore boathouse, was constructed on shore. The final launch from the old boathouse was made on 1 April 2017 and the old boathouse itself was demolished during the  Summer of 2017. The new boathouse accommodates both the inshore lifeboat and the new Shannon-class lifeboat, which has been allocated to Selsey, to replace the Tyne class. The RNLI shop has also been transferred to the new building.

Notable residents

Eric Coates (1886–1957) the English Composer lived and worked in Selsey. He was inspired to write By the Sleepy Lagoon after overlooking the sea towards Bognor Regis. His musical composition can be heard as the theme tune to Desert Island Discs on BBC Radio 4.
Air Commodore Edward 'Teddy' Mortlock Donaldson CB, CBE, DSO, AFC and Bar, LoM (USA) (1912–1992) who set a new world air speed record of 616 mph in September 1946, also breaking the  barrier for the first time in the Star Meteor IV. Donaldson lived at Iron Latch Cottage and there is a blue plaque on the beach at the bottom of Park Lane to mark the event. Donaldson has a second plaque at No. 86, Grafton Road.
Edward Heron-Allen (1861–1943): Selsey's most distinguished resident in the early 20th century, Mr Heron-Allen made an enormous contribution to village life and today is still well known as the author of the classic work on local history for the area.
David Hewlett, (1968– ) British-born Canadian actor, writer, director and voice actor best known for his role as Dr. Rodney McKay on Stargate SG-1, Stargate Atlantis and Stargate Universe resided here for some time before he and his family later emigrated to Canada.
Sir Patrick Moore (1923–2012) – astronomer, writer, researcher, radio commentator and television presenter, lived in Selsey from 1968 until his death.

Cultural references

Selsey Bill is referenced in the song "Saturday's Kids" by The Jam (from the 1979 album Setting Sons), along with Bracklesham Bay, as a place where these working-class children take holiday with their families; "Save up their money for a holiday/To Selsey Bill, or Bracklesham Bay."

Selsey is also mentioned in Ben Jonson's play 'Volpone' in Act 2 Scene 1 in reference to 'Selsey cockles'.

In the opening scene of the Lerner and Loewe musical My Fair Lady, Professor Higgins correctly identifies one of the characters as coming from Selsey.

Selsey is further referenced in the Madness song "Driving in My Car": "I drive up to Muswell Hill, I've even been to Selsey Bill".

Climate

Selsey's climate is classified as warm and temperate. Although Selsey is in one of the sunnier areas of the UK, there is rainfall throughout the year and even the driest month still has rain. Probably the most problematic climatic hazard is wind. The town is situated in an area where tornadoes and waterspouts are common. A tornado in 1986 damaged 200 houses and cut a swathe 70 metres wide. Another tornado in 1998 left an estimated £10m of destruction and damaged the late Patrick Moore's observatory.

Nature
In 2015, around 50 Smooth-hound sharks were observed near the beach at Selsey.

See also
Baron Selsey
Bishops of Selsey
Selsey (electoral division)
Selsey South (UK electoral ward)
Selsey North (UK electoral ward)
St Peter's Church, Selsey
West Sussex Railway

Notes

Sources
 
 
 
 
 
 
 
 
  - The author was simply described as A Gentleman of Chichester. Not clear why his identity was hidden!

External links

  West Sussex County Council
 Selsey Photo Archive

 
Towns in West Sussex
Cricket in Sussex
English cricket in the 14th to 17th centuries
Civil parishes in West Sussex
Submerged places
Chichester District
Populated coastal places in West Sussex
Seaside resorts in England